Return of the Girl is the third extended play by South Korean girl group Everglow. The EP was released by Yuehua Entertainment on December 1, 2021, and contains five tracks, including the lead single "Pirate".

Background and release
On November 15, 2021, Yuehua Entertainment announced Everglow would be releasing their third extended play titled Return of the Girl on December 1. A day later, the promotional schedule was released. On November 22, the track listing was released with "Pirate" announced as the lead single. On November 24, the music video teaser for "Pirate" was released. A day later, the highlight medley teaser video was released. On November 28, the choreography performance teaser video for "Pirate" was released.

Commercial performance
Return of the Girl debuted at number ten on South Korea's Gaon Album Chart in the chart issue dated November 28 – December 4, 2021; on the monthly chart, the EP debuted at number 12 in the chart issue for December 2021 with 40,809 copies sold.

Promotion
Prior to the extended play's release, on December 1, 2021, Everglow held a live event online to introduce the EP and communicate with their fans.

Track listing

Charts

Weekly charts

Monthly charts

Sales

Release history

References

2021 EPs
Everglow albums
Korean-language EPs